[[File:Sambo 1770.jpg|thumb|The painting Negro con Mulata produce Zambo ('a black man with a mulatto woman makes a zambo),  Cristóbal Lozano, c. 1771–1776]]Sambo is a derogatory label for a person of African descent in the English language.  Historically, it is a name in American English derived from a Spanish term for a person of African and Native American ancestry.  After the Civil War, during the Jim Crow era and beyond, the term was used in conversation, print advertising and household items as a pejorative descriptor for Black people. The term is now considered offensive in American and British English.

Etymology
This in turn may have come from one of three African language sources. Webster's Third International Dictionary holds that it may have come from the Kongo word  ('monkey')—the z of Latin-American Spanish being pronounced here like the English s. The Royal Spanish Academy gives the origin from a Latin word, possibly the adjective  or another modern Spanish term, both of which translate to 'bow-legged'.

However, in Portugal and Portuguese-speaking Africa, cafuzo is used to refer to someone born of an African person and a person of mixed African and European ancestry.

Another possibility is that Sambo may be a corruption of the name Samba (meaning "second son" in the language of the Fulbe, an ethnicity spread throughout the West African). Michael A. Gomez has argued that Sambo is actually a Muslim name and that men named Sambo in the South were likely to have been slaves who practiced Islam.

 Literature 
Examples of Sambo as a common name can be found as far back as the 19th century. In Vanity Fair (serialised from 1847) by William M. Thackeray, the black-skinned Indian servant of the Sedley family from Chapter One is called Sambo. Similarly, in Uncle Tom's Cabin (1852) by Harriet Beecher Stowe, one of Simon Legree's overseers is named Sambo. Instances of it being used as a stereotypical name for African Americans can be found as early as the Civil War.

The name Sambo became especially associated with the children's book The Story of Little Black Sambo by Helen Bannerman, published in 1899. It was the story of a southern Indian boy named "Sambo" who outwitted a group of hungry tigers. Bannerman also wrote Little Black Mingo, Little Black Quasha, and Little Black Quibba.

 Places 

Sambo's Grave

Sambo's Grave is the 1736 burial site of a young Indian cabin boy or slave, on unconsecrated ground in a field near the small village of Sunderland Point, near Heysham and Overton, Lancashire, England. Sunderland Point used to be a port, serving cotton, sugar and slave ships from the West Indies and North America.

Sambo's restaurant chain
 
The once-popular Sambo's restaurant chain used the Helen Bannerman images to promote and decorate their restaurants, although the restaurants were originally claimed to have been named after the chain's co-owners, Samuel Battistone and Newell Bo'''hnett. The name choice was a contributing factor in the chain's demise in the early 1980s.

See also
Afro-Latin Americans
Casta
Race and ethnicity in Latin AmericaThe Peculiar InstitutionReferences

Bibliography
 Boskin, Joseph (1986) Sambo: The Rise and Demise of an American Jester, New York: Oxford University Press
 Goings, Kenneth (1994) Mammy and Uncle Mose: Black Collectibles and American Stereotyping, Bloomington: Indiana University Press, 

External links
 e-texts of The Story of Little Black Sambo'':
 Plain text version with no illustrations (Project Gutenberg edition)

Anti-African and anti-black slurs
Anti–South Asian slurs
English words